Erhard Melcher (born 1. January 1940) is a German engineer who was one of the founders of AMG Engine Production and Development, a current subsidiary of Mercedes-Benz.

When Aufrecht moved AMG to larger premises in Affalterbach, Melcher left the company to work independently in Burgstall. He and his small company keep supplying engine designs and parts to AMG, e.g. for the Mercedes Formula 3 engine that dominates the Formula Three Euroseries.

External links
bio 

Living people
1940 births
German automotive engineers
Engineers from Baden-Württemberg